The Comet Rendezvous Asteroid Flyby (CRAF) was a cancelled plan for a NASA-led exploratory mission designed by the Jet Propulsion Laboratory during the mid-to-late 1980s and early 1990s, that planned to send a spacecraft to encounter an asteroid, and then to rendezvous with a comet and fly alongside it for nearly three years. The project was eventually canceled when it went over budget; most of the money still left was redirected to its twin spacecraft, Cassini–Huygens, destined for Saturn, so it could survive Congressional budget cutbacks. Most of CRAF's scientific objectives were later accomplished by the smaller NASA spacecraft Stardust and Deep Impact, and by ESA's flagship Rosetta mission.

Overview
Designed to be the first of the planned Mariner Mark II series of spacecraft, CRAF was to closely examine a comet during a part of its orbit around the Sun. It was to launch a heavily instrumented penetrator/lander into the comet's nucleus to measure temperatures and chemical composition. CRAF's other instruments would collect data on the comet's nucleus, its coma, and its 
dust and ion cloud and tail. CRAF was also to provide the first close-up look at how a comet's coma and its tail of dust and ions form. CRAF and Cassini missions were a collaborative project of NASA, the European Space Agency and the federal space agencies of Germany and Italy, as well as the United States Air Force and the United States Department of Energy.

CRAF was to be launched aboard a Titan IV-Centaur rocket in August 1995, but as of February 1991 the launch date was swapped with Cassini and CRAF's launch was moved back to February 1996. The new launch profile included a Venus gravity assist, that added eight months to the planned flight time but offered an increase in payload and better alternatives if the February 1996 launch window were missed. The trajectory would carry CRAF out to the asteroid belt, where a propulsion maneuver would send the spacecraft back toward Earth for a gravity assist boost. CRAF would fly past the Earth in July 1997 to take up its final flight path. By using gravity assist, NASA can launch spacecraft aboard rockets that have less thrust than would be needed for a direct flight.

The spacecraft was to encounter an asteroid named 449 Hamburga in January 1998 en route to the comet. CRAF would take photographs and deploy other scientific measurements during the encounter period.

CRAF's planned cometary target was Comet Kopff. This was named for August Kopff, who discovered it on August 22, 1906, during an observing session at Koenigstuhl Observatory near Heidelberg, Germany.

Ninety-four years after Kopff's  discovery, CRAF  would arrive at the rendezvous point with Comet Kopff — in August 2000. Comet and spacecraft would be at the distance of Jupiter's orbit, and 850 days before closest approach to the Sun, or perihelion. CRAF would fire its penetrator/lander at the comet in August 2001, then would continue to fly beside Kopff. The spacecraft would take data for a total of two and two-thirds years, until about 109 days after they pass closest to the Sun and are outward bound again. It was to be the  first time a spacecraft would have flown in formation with a comet, though a U.S. spacecraft, International Cometary Explorer (ICE), flew  by Comet Giacobini-Zinner in 1985, spacecraft from several countries encountered Comet Halley in 1986, and the Giotto spacecraft flew past Comet Grigg-Skjellerup in 1992.

The comet rendezvous would allow study of matter that scientists think is the original, relatively unchanged material left behind when a cloud of dust and gas collapsed to form the Solar System 4.6 billion years ago. Scientists believe comets now reside in a distant region of the Solar System called the Oort cloud. Current theory holds that gravitational nudges from stars in the Sun's neighborhood send some comets from the Oort cloud falling toward the Sun.

The CRAF spacecraft would fly extremely close to the comet's nucleus, within . The close-up exploration would take place before the coma and tail begin to build, it would observe the nucleus as it becomes active in the growing sunlight and begins to have its lighter elements boil off and form a coma and tails. Later the spacecraft would move in and out through the coma and down the tail to study their properties and the complex processes occurring in them, and to collect samples of dust for detailed analysis on board the spacecraft.

In December 2002 the spacecraft and the comet would make their closest approach to the Sun. They would then head outward again toward aphelion near Jupiter's orbit. On March 31, 2003, the Comet Rendezvous Asteroid Flyby, first primary mission of Mariner Mark II, would end. At that time the Cassini mission, with the second Mariner Mark II spacecraft, would be in its Saturnian-tour phase.

Spacecraft design
Mariner Mark II class spacecraft developed for NASA by JPL were a new design approach advocated by NASA's Solar System Exploration Committee and were intended for flights in the 1990s to the outer planets and primitive bodies, such as comets and asteroids.

CRAF was to be the first Mariner Mark II mission. The second mission, called Saturn Orbiter Titan Probe or SOTP (later Cassini–Huygens), was a Saturn orbiter with a probe designed to plunge into the atmosphere of the ringed planet's largest satellite, Titan. CRAF and SOTP were to use identical Mariner Mark II spacecraft, but each was to carry unique science instruments.

Instrumentation
All of the phenomena associated with comets were to be examined by CRAF's instruments. And because of the long duration of the planned rendezvous — almost three years — it was expected to fill in many of the major gaps in scientific understanding of the strange objects.

The mission's scientific payload was selected in October 1986. It was to include:

Cameras to photograph the nucleus, coma and tail, and changes that occur as Kopff orbits the Sun. Photos also would help scientists determine the comet's size and structure, the location of its poles, its rotation rate and geological structure.
A surface penetrator-lander to be fired into Kopff's nucleus. The instruments aboard the penetrator-lander would collect a sample of cometary ices, study how they change when heated, and perform a chemical analysis of the gases released from the ice. The penetrator would bury its tip, which will contain a gamma-ray spectrometer  measuring abundances of as many as 20 chemical elements, up to one meter (three feet) below the comet's surface. The penetrator was to carry accelerometers to determine Kopff's surface strength and its resistance to puncture, and thermometers to measure temperatures beneath the surface. The penetrator/lander would radio its findings to the spacecraft, which will then relay them to Earth.
 Mass spectrometers to study composition of gases released by the nucleus and the cloud of plasma (ionized  gas) surrounding the nucleus.
 Dust counters, collectors and analyzers to capture samples of the comet's dust and study them on board. The information would help scientists determine the chemical elements that make up the   dust and ice. In addition, the mass, size, shape and composition of individual dust grains will be measured.
 A visual and infrared mapping spectrometer to study chemical composition of the coma and the surface of the nucleus as they change with time.
 A magnetometer and a plasma-wave analyzer to measure interactions between the coma and electrically charged particles streaming from the Sun. The magnetometer was also to measure the comet's intrinsic magnetic field, if it has one.

See also
List of minor planets and comets visited by spacecraft
Deep Impact (spacecraft) (Comet flyby and impact probe, completed)
Rosetta (Comet lander and orbiter, completed 2016)
Champollion (spacecraft) (A cancelled comet lander mission)

References

NASA/Spacelink — FACT SHEET: CRAF
The Comet Rendezvous Asteroid Flyby: A Search For Our Beginnings. NASA/JPL Pasadena CA, May 1987.
Planetary Exploration Through Year 2000: Scientific Rationale. Solar System Exploration Committee, NASA Advisory Council, Washington, D.C., 1988.
A Look Into the Beginning of the Solar System: The Comet Rendezvous/Asteroid Flyby Mission. NASA/JPL, May 1985
Outward to the Beginning: The CRAF and Cassini Missions. NASA/JPL, June 1991

External links
 CRAF info from NSSDC
"Assessment of Planned Scientific Content of the CRAF Mission"  by Drs. Robert O. Pepin and D.M. Hunten, chair and past chair, respectively, the Committee on Planetary and Lunar Exploration, of the National Academy of Sciences, 1985
"Assessment of Planned Scientific Content of the CRAF Mission"  by the National Academy of Sciences, 1987
"On the Scientific Viability of a Restructured CRAF Science Payload"  by the National Academy of Sciences, 1990

Proposed NASA space probes
Missions to comets
Cancelled spacecraft